Mihail Andreyevich Caimacov (born 22 July 1998) is a Moldovan footballer who plays as a midfielder for Torpedo Moscow on loan from Slaven Belupo and Moldova national football team.

Career
Caimacov made his professional debut for Sheriff Tiraspol in the Moldovan National Division on 24 February 2017, coming on as a substitute in the 88th minute for Evgheni Oancea in the away match against Speranța Nisporeni, which finished as a 2–0 win.

On 7 September 2022, Caimacov joined Russian Premier League club FC Torpedo Moscow on loan with an option to buy.

Career statistics

Club

International goal
Scores and results list Moldova's goal tally first.

References

External links
 

1998 births
People from Tiraspol
Living people
Moldovan footballers
Moldova under-21 international footballers
Moldova international footballers
Association football midfielders
FC Sheriff Tiraspol players
NK Osijek players
NK Olimpija Ljubljana (2005) players
FC Koper players
NK Slaven Belupo players
FC Torpedo Moscow players
Moldovan Super Liga players
First Football League (Croatia) players
Croatian Football League players
Slovenian PrvaLiga players
Russian Premier League players
Moldovan expatriate footballers
Moldovan expatriate sportspeople in Croatia
Expatriate footballers in Croatia
Moldovan expatriate sportspeople in Slovenia
Expatriate footballers in Slovenia
Moldovan expatriate sportspeople in Russia
Expatriate footballers in Russia